Gustavo González Hernández is a Mexican politician from the state of Jalisco, Mexico. He is currently serving a 3-year term in the Mexican House of Representatives and belongs to the National Action Party (Partido Acción Nacional, or PAN).

Gustavo González is a lawyer from the Western Institute of Technology and Higher Education (ITESO) in which he also took the master's degree in Politics and Public Administration. In the docent branch from the year 2000 to the year 2009 he was Professor of Government in Big Cities, Local Bylaws and Public Politics II, in the Political Science Career of the University of Guadalajara.

In July 2003 he was elected General Attorney (Sindico Municipal) of the City of Guadalajara, as he was part of the list headed by the candidate for city mayor Emilio González Márquez, reaching office 1 January 2004.

In the year of 2006 he was elected local deputy of the Congress of Jalisco, for the 12 state district, starting his term in February 2007, where he preside the Constitutional Matters legislative committee. He separated of that charge by constitucional license on 28 August 2009.

He's now Federal Deputy of the LXI Chamber of Deputies of the Mexican Congress, and he is secretary of the Constitutional Matters legislative committee, and forms part of the Metropolitan Development and Federalism Strengthen legislative committees. He also is the President of the Bicameral National Security Committee.

External links 
Curriculum vitae of the deputy Gustavo González in the official site of the Mexican Chamber of Deputies
Official Site of the mexican legislator Gustavo González Hernández

1970 births
Living people
National Action Party (Mexico) politicians
Members of the Chamber of Deputies (Mexico)
Members of the Congress of Jalisco
Politicians from Jalisco
21st-century Mexican politicians
Deputies of the LXI Legislature of Mexico